Stephen Wickham is an Australian photographer, painter and printmaker.

Biography
Stephen Wickham was born in 1950 in Melbourne. He studied at Prahran College of Advanced Education in 1972. In 1974 he was awarded a Diploma of Art from the National Gallery Art School of Victoria, then undertook a Graduate Diploma of Education at Melbourne University. He was granted a Masters of Arts (Visual Arts) from Monash University (Gippsland) in 1986.

Wickham has exhibited regularly since the 1980s and has received a number of major commissions for artworks from the Royal Automobile Club of Victoria (2013), the Victorian Tapestry Workshop (2007); the Department of Conservation, Lands & Environment for a poster series (1991); The Robert Holmes à Court Collection, Heytesbury Holdings, Perth, for photographs for Utopia, A Picture Story (1990). He is a member of the Print Council of Australia and was Vice President (1991–1995) of the Australian Print Workshop.

Exhibitions

Solo 
 2017 Non-Objective: Painting, Deakin University Downtown Gallery. Victoria.
 2013 Stephen Wickham @ Factory 49, Factory 49, Marrickville, New South Wales
 2011 12 Snow as Ash: From Stefan to Georg Weisz, Exhibition Gallery, Deakin University, Victoria
 2011 Dark Mantras as Dark Matter, Stephen McLaughlan Gallery, Melbourne, Victoria
 2009 Peppie Vs Godzilla: Part Ι & II, Shell Regional Arts Program, Geelong Art Gallery, Victoria
 2008 Dark Mantra, Stephen McLaughlan Gallery, Melbourne, Victoria
 2007 Peppie Vs Godzilla, Stephen McLaughlan Gallery, Melbourne, Victoria
 2004 Another Apocryphal History of Modernity, Stephen McLaughlan Gallery, Melbourne, Victoria
 2004 ...from Stefan Weisz for Georg Weisz... Icon Museum of Art, Deakin University, Victoria
 2001 ...from Stefan Weisz for Elizabeth, Emil, George Weisz, and Margaret Lasica... Stephen McLaughlan Gallery, 
 1999 Dark Mantras, Stephen McLaughlan Gallery, Melbourne, Victoria
 1998 Arcadian Mists, Byron + Mapp Gallery, Sydney, New South Wales
 1998 Whispers from The Hindu Love Gods, Stephen McLaughlan Gallery, Melbourne, Victoria
 1997 Creatio ex Nihlo, Stephen McLaughlan Gallery, Melbourne, Victoria
 1995 Recent Painting, Stephen McLaughlan Gallery, Melbourne, Victoria
 1994 Works on Paper, William Mora Gallery, Richmond, Victoria
 1994 Photographs, William Mora Gallery, Richmond, Victoria
 1993 The Final Homage to Ivan Kljun and Meditations on the Thoughts of Francis Fukuyama, Powell Street Gallery,
 South Yarra, Victoria
 1991 Photographs from Ubirr, Australian Centre for Photography, Paddington, New South Wales
 1991 Photographs from Ubirr, (accompanying texts by Charles Green), William Mora Gallery, Richmond, Victoria 
 1990 Homage to Ivan Kljun, Powell Street Graphics, South Yarra, Victoria
 1990 Selected Works on Paper, Monash University College, Gippsland, Victoria
 1988 Arcadia Burning, William Mora Gallery, Richmond, Victoria
 1988 From the Russian Suite, Powell Street Graphics, South Yarra, Victoria
 1984 Winter at Mount Buffalo, Visibility Gallery, Melbourne, Victoria
 1982 Sites for A Contemporary Ritual, Queensland College of Arts, Queensland

Group 
 2019 XXV + Celebrate. Stephen McLaughlan Gallery, Melbourne, Victoria.
 2019 Annual group exhibition. Factory 49, Sydney, New South Wales.
 2019 New Modern. RNOP Melbourne. 
 2019 The Road Paintings. 5 Walls Projects, Victoria.
 2019 Sights Unseen. Moreland City Council art collection. Melbourne, Victoria. 
 2018 Beyond the Field (Still). Contemporary Art Tasmania.
 2018 De Natured. Stephen McLaughlan Gallery, Melbourne, Victoria.
 2018 '50 years after The Field”. Factory 49, Sydney, New South Wales.
 2018 LEGACY, Your collection. Our Story. Monash Gallery of Art, Victoria.
 2018 Wyndham Art Prize. Wyndham City Art Gallery.
 2018 #Abstraction 2018. Deakin University, Langford 120, Stephen McLaughlan Gallery, 5 Walls Projects, Victoria. 
 2018 Print Exhibition, Factory 49, Sydney, New South Wales.
 2018 Edge. Langford 120, Melbourne, Victoria.
 2017 The Void-Visible. Abstraction & Non-Objective Art. Deakin University Gallery. Victoria. 
 2017 Reductive-Non-Objective Private Gallery. Kiosk Show Katoomba Falls. NSW.
 2017 VCA ART 150 Scholarship, Margaret Lawrence Gallery, VCA, Melbourne.
 2017 Wyndham Art Prize. Wyndham City Art Gallery.
 2017 Ad Hoc. Stephen McLaughlan Gallery, Melbourne, Victoria
 2016-17 Visions of Utopia, Wollongong Art Gallery, Penrith art Centre.
 2016 Nearly Monochrome, 5 Walls Projects, Footscray Victoria.
 2016 0+1. Digital Prints, Stephen McLaughlan Gallery, Melbourne, Victoria 
 2016 Neo-0-10 #2. Stephen McLaughlan Gallery, Melbourne, Victoria
 2016 Annual Group Exhibition, Factory 49, Sydney, New South Wales
 2016 McClelland Collection, McClelland Gallery, Victoria
 2016 Limited Edition, Burnie Regional Art Gallery
 2015 Geelong Acquisitive Print Awards. Geelong Gallery
 2015 Grid: Matrix Module Myth. Langford 120, Melbourne, Victoria.
 2015 NEO-0-10 works on paper. McLaughlan Gallery, Melbourne, Victoria. 2015 Print Award. Geelong Gallery, Geelong, Victoria
 2015 Fremantle Arts Centre Print Award. Fremantle Western Australia
 2015 10th Annual Group Exhibition, Factory 49, Marrickville, New South Wales 2015 The Burnie Print Prize. Burnie Regional Art Gallery
 2015 Digital Reductive. 5 Walls Projects, Footscray Victoria.
 2014-2015 ELEMENTA. La Trobe regional Gallery and Gippsland Art Gallery Collection Exhibition. 2014 Gold Coast Art Prize 2014, The Art Centre Gold Coast, Queensland.
 2014 Works on Paper 2014. Charles Nodrum Gallery, Melbourne, Victoria
 2014 Abstraction 13, Charles Nodrum Gallery, Melbourne, Victoria
 2014 Paper @ Factory 49. Factory 49, Sydney, New South Wales
 2014 Annual Group Exhibition, Factory 49, Sydney, New South Wales
 2014 National Works on Paper Awards. MPRG, Victoria
 2014 Swan Hill Print and Drawing Award. Swan Hill Regional Art Gallery, Victoria
 2014 Dark: More than Black. Stephen McLaughlan Gallery, Melbourne, Victoria
 2013 14 SNO 100. SNO Contemporary Art Projects, Sydney, New South Wales
 2013 14 Splash! From the Permanent Collections. New England Regional Art Museum, New South Wales 
 2013 Squaring up. Langford 120, 120 Langford Street, Melbourne, Victoria
 2013 Black Echo, Stephen McLaughlan Gallery, Melbourne, Victoria
 2013 Abstraction 12, Charles Nodrum Gallery, Melbourne, Victoria
 2013 SNO 99, SNO Contemporary Art Projects, Sydney, New South Wales
 2013 Factory 49 @ Stephen McLaughlan Gallery, Melbourne, Victoria
 2013 Annual Group Exhibition, Factory 49, Sydney, New South Wales
 2013 All breathing in heaven, Geelong Gallery, Geelong, Victoria
 2013 2013 Geelong acquisitive print awards, Geelong Gallery, Geelong, Victoria
 2012/13 Gold Coast Art Prize 2012, The Art Centre Gold Coast, Queensland
 2012 Abstraction 11, Charles Nodrum Gallery, Melbourne, Victoria
 2012 Geelong Contemporary Art Prize, Geelong Gallery, Geelong, Victoria
 2012 Five decades of abstraction, Geelong Gallery, Geelong, Victoria
 2012 Non-objective – present. Langford 120, 120 Langford Street, Melbourne, Victoria
 2012 Recent Acquisitions, Burnie Regional Art Gallery, New South Wales
 2011 and now, regarding that modernist remark abstraction, Stephen McLaughlan Gallery, Melbourne, Victoria
 2011 My Australia, Kuandu Museum of Fine Arts, Taipei National University of the Arts, Taiwan 
 2011 Contemporary Landscapes, Colour Factory Gallery, Melbourne, Victoria
 2011 Beyond Big Land, Geelong Gallery, Geelong, Victoria
 2011 New Romantics, Gippsland Art Gallery, Victoria
 2011 New Romantics, MARS Gallery, Melbourne, Victoria
 2010/11 The Naked Face: Self-portraits, The Ian Potter Centre, National Gallery of Victoria, Victoria
 2010/11 Beyond Big Land, Stephen McLaughlan Gallery, Melbourne, Victoria
 2010 2010 Fletcher Jones Art Prize, Geelong Gallery, Victoria
 2010 Contemporary woven tapestries from the Victorian Tapestry Workshop and ceramic work by members of Ceramics Victoria, Walker Street Gallery, Dandenong, Victoria
 2010 52 — a print exchange portfolio, Shell Regional Arts Program, Geelong Gallery, Victoria
 2009 QUIET!, Stephen McLaughlan Gallery, Melbourne, Victoria
 2009 2009 Geelong Acquisitive Print Awards, Geelong Gallery, Victoria
 2009 Contemporary Woven Tapestries, Central Goldfields Art Gallery, Victoria
 2009 Abstraction 2009, Stephen McLaughlan Gallery, Melbourne, Victoria
 2008 Small Tapestries: 2009 Collection, Victorian Tapestry Workshop, Melbourne, Victoria
 2008 Bias Bound, Victorian Tapestry Workshop, Stephen Mc Laughlan Gallery, Melbourne, Victoria
 2008 Salon 2008: Photographic, Stephen Mc Laughlan Gallery, Melbourne, Victoria
 2008 von Guerard to von Stumer — aspect of a collection, Geelong Gallery, Victoria
 2007 Stephen Mc Laughlan at FOURTYFIVEDOWNSTAIRS, FOURTYFIVEDOWNSTAIRS, Melbourne, Victoria 
 2007 Sci-Fi 2007, Stephen McLaughlan Gallery, Melbourne, Victoria
 2006 Twelfth Anniversary Exhibition, Stephen McLaughlan Gallery, Melbourne, Victoria
 2006 John Leslie Art Prize 2006, Gippsland Art Gallery, Sale, Victoria
 2006 White mantle: the winter landscape in Australian art, Geelong Gallery, Victoria
 2006 Sylvan Shades, Stephen McLaughlan Gallery, Melbourne, Victoria
 2006 Swan Hill Print & Drawing Prize, Swan Hill Art Gallery, Victoria
 2005 bestiary, Stephen McLaughlan Gallery, Melbourne, Victoria
 2004 Imagining the Future, Lab 3000 Digital Design Biennale 2004, Melbourne Museum, Victoria
 2004 Between Three Silences, Ord Minett Foyer Gallery, Melbourne, Victoria
 2004 Robert Jacks Drawing Prize, Bendigo Art Gallery, Victoria
 2004 Print & Drawing Acquisitive Awards, Swan Hill Regional Art Gallery, Victoria
 2004 A Humble Gesture, Stephen McLaughlan Gallery, Melbourne, Victoria
 2003 Robert Jacks Drawing Prize, Bendigo Art Gallery, Victoria
 2004 City of Banyule Works on Paper Art Award, City of Banyule, Ivanhoe, Victoria
 2004 Darebin–La Trobe Acquisitive Art Prize, Bundoora Homestead Art Centre & La Trobe University Museum of
 Art, Bundoora, Victoria
 2004 National Photographic Purchase Award, Albury Regional Art Gallery, Victoria
 2004 National Works on Paper, Mornington Peninsula Regional Gallery, Victoria
 2004 Sleeps with Angels — Sex & Death, Stephen McLaughlan Gallery, Melbourne, Victoria
 2004 Summer Salon, Centre for Contemporary Photography, Melbourne, Victoria
 2002 Figure Out, Mass Gallery, Melbourne, Victoria
 2002 2002 Nikon Summer Salon, Centre for Contemporary Photography, Melbourne, Victoria
 2002 Abstract Painting — Salon 2002, Stephen McLaughlan Gallery, Melbourne, Victoria
 2001 The Eighteenth McGregor Prize for Photography, University of Southern Queensland, Queensland 
 2001 Nikon Summer Salon, Centre for Contemporary Photography, Melbourne, Victoria
 2001 Summer Stock, Stephen McLaughlan Gallery, Melbourne, Victoria
 2000 Gallery Artists, Byron + Mapp Gallery, Sydney, New South Wales
 2000 National Works on Paper, Mornington Peninsula Art Centre, Victoria
 2000 Some Photographs, Stephen McLaughlan Gallery, Melbourne, Victoria
 1999 Christmas Show, Australian Galleries, Works on Paper Gallery, Sydney, New South Wales 1999 7th International Works on Paper Fair, Sydney, New South Wales
 1999 4th Anniversary Exhibition, Byron + Mapp, Sydney, New South Wales
 1999 Contemporary Australian Works on Paper presented by Australian Galleries, Smith & Stoneley, Queensland
 1999 Contemporary Australian Works on Paper, Australian Galleries, Works on Paper Gallery, Sydney, New South Wales
 1999 Visy Board Art Prize, Barossa Valley, South Australia
 1999 Selected Works from Goddard de Fiddes Gallery Perth, Stephen McLaughlan Gallery, Melbourne, Victoria
 1999 Summer Salon 1999, Centre for Contemporary Photography, Melbourne, Victoria
 1998 Double Dialogues, Deakin University Theatreworks, Victoria
 1998 Selected Works on Paper, Australian Galleries, Works on Paper Gallery, Sydney, New South Wales
 1998 Geelong Contemporary Art Prize, Geelong Gallery, Victoria
 1998 Works on Paper, 1998, Stephen McLaughlan, Melbourne, Victoria
 1998 National Works on Paper, Mornington Peninsula Regional Gallery, Victoria
 1998 13 Artists Recent Works on Paper, Australian Galleries, Sydney, New South Wales
 1998 Pictures from the Collection, Byron + Mapp Gallery, Sydney, New South Wales
 1998 9 x 5 by Twenty-Five, George Adams Gallery, Melbourne, Victoria
 1998 Summer Stock, Stephen McLaughlan Gallery, Melbourne, Victoria
 1998 Summer Salon 1998, Centre for Contemporary Photography, Melbourne, Victoria
 1997 13th Biennial Spring Festival of Drawing, Mornington Peninsula Regional Gallery, Victoria
 1997 2D/3D, Artis Gallery, Auckland, New Zealand
 1996/97 Non- Objective Presence, Australian Galleries, Sydney, New South Wales & Melbourne, Victoria
 1996 Two Australian Painters: Allan Mitelman and Stephen Wickham, Artis Gallery, Auckland, New Zealand
 1996 The XLR8 Summer Salon 1996, Centre for Contemporary Photography, Melbourne, Victoria
 1995 The Situation Now: A Survey of Local Non-Objective Art, La Trobe University Art Museum, Victoria
 1995 9x5 Exhibition, Anti-Grand Prix Exhibition, Robert Lindsay Gallery, Melbourne, Victoria
 1995 Staff Exhibition, Victorian College of the Arts Gallery, Melbourne, Victoria
 1995 Out of Stock, Artis Gallery, Auckland, New Zealand
 1995 The 1995 Postcard Show, Linden Gallery, St Kilda, Victoria
 1994 No-Name Big Little Picture Show, Centre for Contemporary Photography, Melbourne, Victoria
 1994 Arts Works 6, Gallery 101 Collins Street, Melbourne, Victoria
 1994 Silent Objects: Non-Objective Art from Melbourne, Centre for Contemporary Art, Hamilton and Artis Gallery, Auckland, New Zealand
 1994 Bezalel Arts, Caulfield Arts Complex, Victoria
 1994 Recent Acquisitions, McClelland Gallery, Langwarrin, Victoria
 1993 An Exhibition of Contemporary Jewish Art, Westpac Gallery, Melbourne, Victoria
 1992 PaperWorks 3 — Scotland, Seagate Gallery, Dundee, UK
 1992 Then ... and Now, Box Hill Community Arts Centre, Box Hill, Victoria
 1992 Melbourne Art, Melbourne Artists, Melbourne Savage Club Invitation Art Prize, McClelland Gallery, Langwarrin, Victoria
 1990 A.Z. Gallery, Tokyo, Japan
 1990 It All Starts Here, Powell Street Gallery, South Yarra, Victoria
 1989 Henri Worland Memorial Print Award, Warrnambool Arts Centre, Victoria
 1988 8th Print Biennale, Mornington Peninsula Arts Centre, Victoria
 1987 Australian Contemporary Photographers, National Gallery of Victoria, Melbourne, Victoria 1987 Six Victorian Artists, Albury Regional Art Gallery, Victoria
 1987 A Group Show, Print Council of Australia, North Melbourne, Victoria
 1987 Henri Worland Memorial Print Award, Warrnambool Arts Centre, Victoria
 1986 Australian Landscape Photographed, National Gallery of Victoria, Melbourne, Victoria 1987 Invitation Print Exhibition, Reconnaissance, Melbourne, Victoria
 1987 Six Victorian Printmakers, Darling Downs Institute of Advanced Education, Queensland
 1987 7th Print Biennale, Mornington Peninsula Arts Centre, Victoria
 1987 Members Prints, Print Council of Australia, North Melbourne, Victoria
 1987 Prints To Cuba, Australian Artists Exchange to Cuba, Cuba, United States of America
 1985 Proofs Exhibition, McClelland Gallery, Langwarrin, Victoria
 1985 Exchange Exhibition USA, Print Council of Australia, North Melbourne, Victoria
 1984 Emerging Victorian Printmakers, Mitchelton Exhibition, La Trobe University Gallery & Benalla Art Gallery 
 1984 Sculptors As Craftsmen, Meat Market Craft Centre, Melbourne, Victoria
 1984 6th Print Biennale, Mornington Peninsula Arts Centre, Victoria
 1983 Proof Exhibition, Victorian Print Workshop, Fitzroy, Victoria
 1982 Landscape Australia, National Gallery of Vi==  Department ==of Photography, Victoria
 1980 Forty Australian Artists, Adelaide Festival of Arts, South Australia
 1980 Air Show, Contemporary Art Space, Adelaide, South Australia
 1979 Selected Works from The Mitchell Endowment, National Gallery of Victoria, Melbourne, Victoria
 1975 Recent Acquisitions, National Gallery of Victoria, Department of Photography, Melbourne, Victoria

Collections 
 2018 Penrith Regional Gallery, Home of The Lewers Bequest. Paintings. 
 2018 Wollongong Art Gallery. Painting.
 2018 Penrith Regional Gallery, Home of The Lewers Bequest. Paintings. 
 2018 Wollongong Art Gallery. Painting.
 2017 Deakin University. Painting.
 2017 State of Library of Victoria, Photographs, lithographs.
 2016 Deakin University, Works on paper. 
 2016 Deakin University, Photographs.
 2015 RACV Collection. Photographs.
 2014 Geelong Gallery. Painting.
 2014 MAMA. Murray Art Museum Albury. Photographs.
 2014 Counihan Gallery, Brunswick. Silver Prints.
 2013 Deakin University, Painting
 2012 La Trobe Regional Gallery. Colour Photographs.
 2011 The Arts Centre Gold Coast. Painting and photographs.
 2010 Burnie Regional Art Gallery Print Collection, Dry point Etching.
 2009 The Peter Mac Art Collection, Painting installation.
 2009 Warrnambool Art Gallery, Multi-coloured lithograph and etchings.
 2008 Australian Embassy Washington DC, Colour photographs.
 2008 McClelland Gallery, Suite of drawings.
 2005 Deakin University, Colour photographs.
 2004 Monash Gallery of Art, Colour photographs.
 2003 National Gallery of Australia, Lithographs.
 2003 Australia Print Workshop Archive 2, Lithographs.
 2003 Works on paper New England Regional Art Museum. Works on paper. 
 2001 Geelong Gallery, Works on paper.
 2001 Ballarat Fine Art Gallery, Photographs.
 2001 State of Library of Victoria, Colour photographs.
 1998 Museum of Modern Art at Heide, Lithographs.
 1998 National Library of Australia, Photographs.
 1998 Art Bank, Paintings.
 1996 National Gallery of Australia, Multi-coloured lithographs.
 1995 University of Melbourne Art Collection, Etchings.
 1995 New England Regional Art Museum. Works on paper.
 1995 McClelland Gallery, Etchings.
 1994 State Library of Victoria Picture Collection, Ciba-chrome prints.
 1994 Council of Adult Education, Melbourne, Multi-coloured lithograph.
 1994 McClelland Gallery, Etchings.
 1993 Benalla Regional Art Gallery, Etchings and SX-70 polaroids.
 1993 National Gallery of Victoria, Etchings.
 1993 McClelland Gallery, Suite of drawings.
 1993 State Library of Victoria Picture Collection, Silver prints, polaroids and assemblages. 
 1993 Horsham Regional Art Centre, Silver prints.
 1993 Camberwell Grammar Art Collection, Drawing
 1990 Victorian College of the Arts Collection, Lithographs
 1989 State Library of Victoria Picture Collection, Ciba-chrome photographs & silver prints 
 1988 Overseas Telecommunications Corporation, Lithographs.
 1987 Art Bank, Etchings.
 1987 National Gallery of Victoria, Department of Photography, Ciba-chrome photographs.
 1987 Victorian Print Workshop, Etchings.
 1986 Art Bank, Lithographs.
 1986 City of Waverley Collection, Etchings.
 1986 Commission for The Future, Lithographs.
 1986 Print Council of Australia, Member print.
 1985 City of Box Hill Art Collection, Lithograph.
 1984 Albury Regional Art Gallery, Silver prints.
 1984 City of Box Hill Art Collection, Silver prints.
 1984 Box Hill College of TAFE, Silver prints.
 1983 National Gallery of Victoria, Department of Photography, Silver prints.
 1983 Victorian Print Workshop, Lithographs.
 1982 National Gallery of Victoria, Department of Photography, Kodak instant photographs. 
 1978 National Gallery of Victoria, Michelle Endowment, Painting.

Awards 
 1975 National Gallery of Victoria, Department of Photography, Silver prints.
 2007 Artist in Residence, Victorian Tapestry Workshop, Melbourne, Victoria
 1996 Landscape Photography Prize, Centre for Contemporary Photography Summer Salon, Melbourne, Victoria 
 1974 Hugh Ramsay Drawing Prize, National Gallery School, Melbourne, Victoria
 1974 Special Jury Prize for Portraiture, Trustees of the National Gallery of Victoria, Melbourne, Victoria

Publications 
 Green, C. & Wickham, S.,“Abstract”, West, Dr. Rex Butler (Editor), 1991

Bibliography 
 Allen, C., ‘Face Facts’, The Australian, 8 January 2011
 Allen, C., ‘Memories, references and conceits’, Australian Art Monthly, March 1997
 Backhouse, M., ‘Art Galleries’, The Age, 29 April 2006
 Beaumont, L., ‘Uncommon threads’ The Age A2, 9 August 2008
 Bellamy, L., ‘Artist’s four-legged muse’, The Age Metro, 11 April 2005
 
  
 Boddington, J., Winter At Mount Buffalo, Catalogue Essay, Visibility Gallery, 1984
 
 
 Catalano, G., ‘Moves To The Periphery Of Taste’, The Age, 27 April 1990
 Catalano, G., ‘Review’, The Age, 3 August 1988
 Cawthorne, Z., ‘Purple Patch’, Herald Sun, 8 February 1997
 Crawford, A., ‘Between Three Silences’, The Sunday Age, 31 October 2004
 Faust, B., ‘Landscape Art Flourishes In The Wilderness’, The Age, 20 June 1984
 Faust, B., ‘Wit, Mystery And Magic’, The Age, 24 June 1987
 
 
 
Gregg, S., New Romantics: Darkness and Light in Australian Art, Australian Scholarly Publishing, 2011
 Hanson, D., ‘Out there, Man’, The Age, 9 March 2007
 Harper, J., ‘Gallery Godzilla’, The Geelong Advertiser, 3 February 2009
 Harris, R., ‘Photos Developing as Collectibles’, The Age, 27 November 1995
 * 
 
 Heathcote, C., ‘A Fresh Direction’, Art Monthly, March 1993
 Heathcote, C., ‘A Show at the Cutting Edge’, The Age, 1 July 1992
 Heathcote, C., ‘Audacious Works are a Fine Farewell to Powell Street Gallery’, The Age, 24 March 1993
 Heathcote, C., ‘Australian artists and environmental awareness’, Australian Art Monthly, no. 125 November 1999 
 Heathcote, C., ‘Following a Bright Vanguard’, The Age, 26 October 1994
 Heathcote, C., ‘from Stefan Weisz for Elizabeth, Emil, Georg Weisz and Margaret Lasica....’, Artlink, vol. 20 no. 3, September 201
 Heathcote, C., ‘Imagined Worlds Provide the Inspiration for a New Movement’, The Age, 9 December 1992 
 Heathcote, C., ‘New Abstract Works from Rival Traditions’, The Age, 5 August 1992
 Heathcote, C., ‘Mankind, Morality and What it's all About’, The Age, 20 July 1994
 Heathcote, C., ‘Margaret Stewart Endowment Part 2’, The Age, 2 July 1993
 Heathcote, C., ‘Rumours Meet Their Match’, The Age, 8 June 1994
 
 Heathcote, C., ‘When Antonioni Met Rothko’, Quadrant, January–February 2012 
 Hemensley, C., ‘Everything and Nothing’, Photofile, Spring 1984
 Kempson, R., ‘The born-again Antipodeans’, Art Monthly (letters to editor), April 1997 
 
 Makin, J., ‘Critic’s Choice’, Herald Sun, 11 June 2007
 
 McLeod, D. & Karoich, S., Emerging Victorian Printmakers, Catalogue Essay, Mitchelton Exhibition, La Trobe University Gallery & Benalla Art Gallery, 1984
 
 Modra, P., ‘Peppie Vs Godzilla Part I & 2’, The Sunday Age, February 2009
 
 McNamara T. J., ‘Diffidence from across the ditch’, New Zealand Herald, 10 October 1996
 McNamara, T. J., ‘Perspective on Art’, New Zealand Herald, September 1994
 Nelson, R., ‘Nostalgic journey through the landscape’, The Age, 16 June 2001
 Reynolds, R., ‘Abstract work enthuses buffs’, Geelong Advertiser, 28 July 2010
 Rooney, R. ‘Borgelt’, The Australian, February 1997
 Rooney, R., ‘Fullbrook, Thomas, Wickham’, The Australian, 23 June 1995
 Smee, S., ‘Abstract: alive and cliquing’, Sydney Morning Herald, December 1996
 
 Smee, S., ‘Abstract: alive and cliquing’, Sydney Morning Herald, December 1996
 Strong, G., ‘A Balanced View of Landscape’, The Age, 17 February 1982
 
 
 Webb, P., ‘Art that multiplies rather than abstracts’, The Age, 19 February 1999
 Webb, P., ‘Box Office, Visual Arts,’ The Age 'Melbourne Magazine', September 2009
 Webb, P., ‘Patterns of control and chance’, The Age, 21 May 2008
 Webb, P., ‘Visual Arts’, The Sunday Age: Preview, 13 May 2007
 
 Zimmer, J., ‘The wonderful resilience of the non-objective ideal’, Art Monthly, May 1997

References

External links 
 Artist website

Australian photographers
1950 births
Living people